Ben Ferreira (born April 5, 1979) is a Canadian former competitive figure skater. He is the 2004 Skate Canada International silver medallist, the 2004 Bofrost Cup on Ice silver medallist, and a three-time Canadian national medallist.

Career 
Ferreira placed 12th at the 1998 World Junior Championships.

In the 1999–2000 season, he won the bronze medal at the Canadian Championships. He placed tenth at the 2000 Four Continents and 19th at the 2000 World Championships in Nice, France.

In the 2000–01 season, Ferreira repeated as the Canadian national bronze medallist and went on to place ninth at the 2001 Four Continents. He was coached by Jan Ullmark at The Royal Glenora Club in Edmonton, Alberta.

In 2001–02, Ferreira placed fifth at the Canadian Championships and 15th at the 2002 World Championships. Steffany Hanlen and Doug Leigh were his coaches.

In the 2002–03 season, he finished tenth at the 2002 Bofrost Cup on Ice and fourth at the Canadian Championships. He was coached by Doug Leigh at the Mariposa School of Skating in Barrie, Ontario.

Ferreira won silver at the 2004 Canadian Championships. He was seventh at the 2004 Four Continents and 13th at the 2004 World Championships. The following season, he won silver at the 2004 Skate Canada International and at the 2004 Bofrost Cup on Ice. After finishing off the podium at the Canadian Championships, he achieved his best ISU Championship result, fourth, at the 2005 Four Continents.

Ferreira placed eighth at the 2006 Canadian Championships. He retired from competition in January 2006. He is the Head Skating Professional at the Royal Glenora Club in Edmonton, Alberta.

Personal life 
Ferreira was born on April 5, 1979 in Vancouver, British Columbia. He married Jadene (née Fullen) on May 21, 2005. His wife works as a choreographer at the Royal Glenora Club and choreographed for Ferreira during his competitive career.

Programs

Results 
GP: Grand Prix, JGP: Junior Series (Junior Grand Prix)

References

External links

 Official website (archived)
 
 Royal Glenora

1979 births
Living people
Canadian male single skaters
Canadian people of Portuguese descent
Figure skaters from Edmonton
Figure skaters from Vancouver